San Martino Vallata is Roman Catholic parish church located at Corso Roma #71 (or Via San Martino Vallata) in the town of Polinago, in the region of Emilia-Romagna, Italy.

History
A church here predates its elevation to parish church in 1627, when it was first place under the control of the Diocese of Cassano. In 1746, a landslide razed the church. The parish rebuilt this church, with a neo-Romanesque facade and mullioned windows in the bell-tower, not far from the prior spot, reconsecrated in 1756.

References

18th-century Roman Catholic church buildings in Italy
Churches in the province of Modena
Roman Catholic churches completed in 1756